Maendy and variant spellings of the word, is a common place name in Wales and  in other countries where people of Welsh descent have settled. It may refer  to:

 Maindee - a suburb of Newport
 Maindy - a suburb of Cardiff
 Maendy Quarry - a toxic waste land-fill
+ ((Maendy))- stone